William Haworth (1880 - 1960) was Dean of  Glasgow and Galloway from 1946 to 1959.

He was born on 30 March 1880, educated at  Emmanuel College, Cambridge; and ordained deacon in 1903,  and priest in 1904. After curacies in Tynemouth and Elswick he was priest in charge of Bridge of Weir. He was the Rector of St George, Glasgow from 1920 until 1943; and then Largs from 1944 until 1959.

He died on 13 February 1960.

References

Alumni of Emmanuel College, Cambridge
Deans of Glasgow and Galloway
1880 births
1960 deaths